Louis Zatonga was a Congolese politician. Zatonga was appointed one of two secretaries of the Bureau of the National Assembly in 1973. He was appointed Minister of Territorial Administration, Post and Telecommunications in 1975. When the cabinet was reshuffled in April 1977, Zatonga lost his seat in the government. He served as Mayor of Brazzaville from 1977 to 1979.

See also
 List of mayors of Brazzaville
 Timeline of Brazzaville

References

Living people
Year of birth missing (living people)
Mayors of Brazzaville
Government ministers of the Republic of the Congo
Members of the National Assembly (Republic of the Congo)
Mayors of places in the Republic of the Congo
People from Brazzaville